A metro township is a type of municipal government in Utah equivalent to a civil township.  These were first allowed in Utah starting in 2015 (per Senate Bill 199 – the Community Preservation Act) both to allow existing unincorporated communities to avoid piecemeal annexation, and to give those residents some say in local government, without creating additional government overhead. While each metro township has a mayor and township council, manages a budget, and cannot be annexed without its permission, its powers of taxation are limited, and it must contract with other municipalities and/or municipal shared-service districts for most municipal services (police, for example). The five metro townships – all located in Salt Lake County – are Kearns, Magna, Copperton, Emigration Canyon and White City.

References

U.S. Board on Geographic Names
U.S. Census Bureau TIGER/Line

Townships
Local government in the United States